Lieutenant-Colonel Daniel Patrick Driscoll  (11 May 1862?, Burma? – 6 August 1934, Mombasa, Kenya) was a British Army officer of Irish descent, awarded many military honours for his combat service in Burma, the Union of South Africa, and German East Africa in the First World War.

Driscoll served in the British Merchant Navy from 1879 to 1882. He served in the Third Anglo-Burmese War in 1886–1889 (medal and clasp).

During the Second Boer War, Driscoll was a captain and later a lieutenant-colonel in command of the Driscoll Scouts, a reconnaissance unit that he formed despite some official opposition. For his combat service from 1900 to 1902 he was honoured with despatches twice, Queen's Medal with four clasps, King's medal with two clasps, and D.S.O. in 1900.

Driscoll stayed in South Africa until after the end of the Second Boer War, and in November 1902 left Port Natal on the SS Ortona bound for Rangoon, British India.

At the start of the First World War, Driscoll wrote to the War Office with a suggestion for guerrilla warfare behind the German lines. In February 1915 he formed the 25th Battalion of the Royal Fusiliers with many recruits from the Legion of Frontiersmen.

Driscoll was awarded the Croix de Guerre in May 1917 and appointed Companion of the Order of St Michael and St George (CMG) in March 1919.

On 9 June 1880 in Calcutta, he married Isabella Marchall; their marriage produced several children.

References

1862 births
1934 deaths
British Army personnel of the Second Boer War
British Army personnel of World War I